Diadegma callisto is a wasp first described by Horstmann in 1993.
No subspecies are listed.

References

callisto
Insects described in 1993